Coleophora linosyridella is a moth of the family Coleophoridae. It is found from Germany to the Pyrenees and Italy and from Great Britain to Romania.

The wingspan is 11.5-13.5 mm. Adults are on wing from late June to August in one generation per year.

The larvae feed on Aster linosyris, Aster sedifolius and Aster tripolium. They create a tubular silken case of up to 8 mm long. Behind the mouth, the case is sharply bent resulting in a mouth angle of 0°. Mining occurs up to April.

References

linosyridella
Moths described in 1880
Moths of Europe